Hans von Hallwyl (c. 1433/1434, Kanton Aargau – 19 March 1504) was a Swiss army commander, most notable for his major part in the Old Swiss Confederacy's victory at the Battle of Morat on 22 June 1476. He also fought at Grandson on 2 March 1476 against the expansionist plans of Charles the Bold, Duke of Burgundy.

External links 
 Hallwyl and Waldmann

1433 births
1504 deaths
Swiss military personnel